Arcadia is a city in Los Angeles County, California, United States, located about  northeast of downtown Los Angeles in the San Gabriel Valley and at the base of the San Gabriel Mountains. It contains a series of adjacent parks consisting of the Santa Anita Park racetrack, the Los Angeles County Arboretum and Botanic Garden, and Arcadia County Park. The city had a population of 56,364 at the 2010 census, up from 53,248 at the 2000 census. The city is named after Arcadia, Greece.

History

Native American
For over 8,000 years, the site of Arcadia was part of the homeland of the Tongva people ("Gabrieliño" tribe), a Californian Native American tribe whose territory spanned the greater Los Angeles Basin, and the San Gabriel and San Fernando Valleys. Their fluid borders stretched between the Santa Susana Mountains, San Bernardino Mountains, and San Gabriel Mountains in the north; the Santa Monica Mountains and Simi Hills in the west; the San Jacinto Mountains and Santa Ana Mountains in the east; and the coast and Catalina Island (Pimu) in the south. A Tongva settlement site within present-day Arcadia was known as Alyeupkigna (or Aluupkenga).

Rancho period
The town's site became part of the Spanish Mission San Gabriel Arcángel lands in 1771. After Indian Reductions to become Mission Indians, the Tongva were known as the Gabrieliños after the Mission's name. and under whose control these people worked during the mission period in California. Currently there are 1,700 people self-identifying as members of the Tongva or Gabrieliño tribe.

The Mexican land grant for Rancho Santa Anita was issued to Perfecto Hugo Reid and his Tongva wife, Victoria Bartolomea Comicrabit, in 1845. It was named after a family relation, Anita Cota, on his wife's side. Reid documented the Gabrieliño Native Americans in a series of letters written in 1852, and served as a delegate to the 1849 California Constitutional Convention. In 1847, Reid sold Rancho Santa Anita to his Rancho Azusa neighbor, Henry Dalton.

Lucky Baldwin
The rancho changed owners several times before being acquired by Gold Rush immigrant, businessman, and major regional land owner Elias Jackson "Lucky" Baldwin in 1875. Baldwin purchased  of Rancho Santa Anita for $200,000. Upon seeing the area, he gasped "By Gads! This is paradise!" Upon buying the land, Baldwin chose to make the area his home and immediately started erecting buildings and cultivating the land for farming, orchards, and ranches. Baldwin built the Queen Anne Cottage for his fourth wife and himself in 1885–1886, now preserved within the Arboretum. In 1885, the main line of the Los Angeles and San Gabriel Valley Railroad, in which Baldwin was a stockholder, was opened through the ranch, making subdivision of part of the land into a town site practical. Later, this rail line became a Santa Fe Railroad line. In 1889, on a site just north of the corner of First Avenue and St. Joseph Street, adjacent to the Santa Fe tracks, Baldwin opened the 35-room Hotel Oakwood to be the centerpiece of his new town. In 1890, the extant Rancho Santa Anita Depot was built.

20th century until World War II
By the turn of the 20th century, Arcadia had a population nearing 500 and an economy that was coming to be based on entertainment, sporting, hospitality, and gambling opportunities, the latter including an early version of the Santa Anita race track. Baldwin oversaw the incorporation of Arcadia into a city in 1903, and was its first mayor.

Anoakia

The  residence was in the Italian Renaissance Revival style, with murals by Maynard Dixon. The estate had a significant Greek Revival-style colonnaded "Parthenon" bathhouse/gymnasium beside a large pool, an apiary and aviaries, kennels and stables, tennis courts and pergolas, and preserved the native oak woodlands.

After her death in 1939 the estate became the Anoakia School for Girls, which became the coeducational Anoakia School in 1967, then moved to Duarte in 1990 as the Anita Oaks School. The school owner's efforts to develop the property into a village of homes with the old mansion as its centerpiece were rejected by the city. After an extended debate, with local citizens and regional preservationists efforts to preserve the historic main house, the city council voted to approve demolition for a real estate development by new owners in 1999. The "Anoakia" mansion, all other significant estate structures and outbuildings, garden features, and numerous California sycamore and Coast live oak trees were demolished for 31 luxury home sites in 2000. Some of the mansion's architectural elements were salvaged and removed. The gatehouse, on the estate's former southeast corner at Foothill and Baldwin, and the perimeter walls remain after the "Anoakia Estates" development was built. The bas-relief fountain was moved to just inside the new gated entrance.

Inter-war decades

During World War I, Arcadia was home to the U.S. Army's Ross Field Balloon School, at the present-day Santa Anita Park site. Army observers were trained here in techniques to observe enemy activity from hot air balloons.

After World War I, Arcadia's population grew and local businesses included many chicken ranches and other agricultural activities. During the 1920s and 1930s, Arcadia began its transition to the residential city that it is today, as small farms and chicken ranches gave way to homes and numerous civic improvements, including a city library and a city hall. Scenes of many of Arcadia's interesting older sites can be viewed in a series of historic watercolors painted by local artists Edna Lenz and Justine Wishek. The city was on historic U.S. Route 66, present-day Colorado Boulevard, with businesses serving travelers on it.

Thoroughbred horse racing had flourished briefly under Lucky Baldwin, who founded a racetrack adjacent to the present site, until it was outlawed by the state of California in 1909. It returned to Arcadia when racing was legalized again, with the opening of Santa Anita Park in December 1934. Architect Gordon Kaufmann designed its various buildings in a combination of Colonial Revival and Streamline Moderne styles.

Santa Anita Assembly Center

The Santa Anita Assembly Center site is California Historical Landmark #934. In 1942 during World War II, the racetrack grounds were used as a processing and holding site for Japanese Americans who had been removed from their homes and communities for forced relocation and internment under President Franklin Roosevelt's Executive Order 9066. The Civilian Assembly Center at the racetrack became the largest and longest operating one of the eighteen, holding citizens until the Relocation Center camps were completed in interior areas of California and other states. More than 18,000 persons resided at the racetrack in primitive conditions. Four hundred temporary tarpaper barracks were constructed on the racetrack grounds to house many of the detainees, where they lived three families per unit. 8,500 detainees lived in converted horse stalls. Bachelors were housed in the grandstand building. They had group showers, non-private bathrooms, and 24-hour armed surveillance. Each resident was given an "Army manufacture bed, one blanket and one straw tick." The Assembly Center held people from late March through the end of October 1942, when the internees were relocated inland to permanent internment camps at Manzanar and Tule Lake in California, and eight others in Western states and Arkansas.

At the time, Arcadia's civic leaders were very vocal in their support of the Japanese American relocation internment policies of the federal government.

In November 1942 the center was turned over to the United States Army Ordnance Corps for training purposes and was officially renamed Camp Santa Anita. Later in the war it served as a prisoner of war—POW camp, holding several thousand of Rommel's German Afrika Korps soldiers.

Postwar period
Arcadia largely grew up as the well-to-do suburb of neighboring Pasadena, with many early residents being the sons and daughters of long-established Southern California families. A large tract of estate homes was developed by Harry Chandler, the scion of the Los Angeles Times, who lived in adjacent Sierra Madre, California. The city became the residence of choice for many corporate chief executives, including those in the aerospace, horse-racing, and finance industries.

The postwar boom saw Arcadia grow rapidly into a suburban residential community, with many of the chicken ranches being subdivided into home lots. Between 1940 and 1950, the population grew by more than two and a half times. The housing boom continued through the 1950s and 1960s and along with that growth came the necessary infrastructure of schools, commercial buildings, and expanded city services.

During the postwar boom, a modern commercial district developed along Baldwin Avenue south of Huntington Drive in west Arcadia. In 1951 this strip, called the West Arcadia Hub, was anchored by a new, locally owned Hinshaw's department store. This was the first large department store to be built in Arcadia, and the largest in the western San Gabriel Valley outside the city of Pasadena. This development marked the beginning of Arcadia's gradual transformation into one of the leading shopping districts of the San Gabriel Valley.

In 1947,  that comprised the heart of the Baldwin Ranch were deeded to the State of California and the County of Los Angeles, and developed into Los Angeles County Arboretum and Botanic Garden.

Until a Supreme Court ruling in 1965, every property sale contract within the borders of Arcadia had to include a provision that the new owner could only sell the property to a white Protestant. However, these clauses had been ruled unenforceable by the Supreme Court's ruling in 1948's Shelley v. Kraemer, and many non-Protestant families did, in fact, own homes and live in Arcadia well before 1965.

In October 1975, the Santa Anita Fashion Park was opened to the public on the corner of Baldwin Avenue and Huntington Drive, on part of the former Santa Anita Assembly Center site. The center court featured a very large "Blue head" by artist Roy Lichtenstein, which was later removed. The mall expanded in 2004, and renamed Westfield Santa Anita. It was affected by the late 2000s Great Recession, but continues to attract business.

James Dobson, a former Arcadia resident, founded the nonprofit Christian ministry Focus on the Family in the city in 1977. Its original office still stands on the south side of Foothill Boulevard. Focus grew to larger quarters in the city, and in intervening years expanded to Monrovia for warehouse space before moving out of Arcadia completely in 1990. Focus on the Family is now based in Colorado Springs, Colorado, but still has thousands of members in Arcadia.

In the 1980s, the Asian population in Arcadia began to grow. The city had remained 99% white until the late 1970s, but in 1985, the Los Angeles Times reported that the Asian population had grown from 4% in 1980 to an estimated 9%, overtaking Latinos, who accounted for roughly 7% of the population. By the 2010 census, Asians consisted of 59.2% of the population.

In the late 1990s, Native American activists threatened to sue Arcadia High School over its use of the "Apache" mascot. The high school's use of Native American symbols, including an "Apache Joe" mascot, the Pow Wow school newspaper, the Apache News television program, the "Smoke Signals" news bulletin boards, the school's auxiliary team's marching "Apache Princesses" and opposing football team fans' "Scalp the Apaches" signs were viewed by these Native American activists and many Arcadia community members as offensive. Other residents, and some school alumni with Native American ancestry, did not object to their use.  The school consulted with some Native American groups and made some concessions, but did not change the mascot. Arcadia High School has a yearly charity drive for the Apache community.

Geography

Demographics
In 2016, Arcadia was ranked the fifth most expensive housing market in the United States by Business Insider, with an average listing price of $1,748,680 for a four-bedroom home.

In 2012, Arcadia was ranked seventh in the nation on CNN Money magazine's list of towns with highest median home costs.

Arcadia's Upper Rancho neighborhood was ranked the 23rd richest neighborhood in Southern California by Business Insider in 2014, with a mean household income of $310,779.

2010
The 2010 United States Census reported that Arcadia had a population of 56,364. The racial makeup of Arcadia was 33,353 (59.2%) Asian, 18,191 (32.3%) White, (25.7% Non-Hispanic White), 681 (1.2%) African American, 186 (0.3%) Native American, 16 (0.03%) Pacific Islander, 2,352 (4.2%) from other races, and 1,585 (2.8%) from two or more races. Hispanic or Latino of any race were 6,799 persons (12.1%).

The census reported that 55,502 people (98.5% of the population) lived in households, 639 (1.1%) lived in non-institutionalized group quarters, and 223 (0.4%) were institutionalized. There were 19,592 households, out of which 7,336 (37.4%) had children under the age of 18 living in them, 11,703 (59.7%) were opposite-sex married couples living together, 2,437 (12.4%) had a female householder with no husband present, 865 (4.4%) had a male householder with no wife present. There were 469 (2.4%) unmarried opposite-sex partnerships, and 92 (0.5%) same-sex married couples or partnerships. 3,855 households (19.7%) were made up of individuals, and 1,926 (9.8%) had someone living alone who was 65 years of age or older. The average household size was 2.83. There were 15,005 families (76.6% of all households); the average family size was 3.26.

The population was spread out, with 12,290 people (21.8%) under the age of 18, 4,102 people (7.3%) aged 18 to 24, 13,409 people (23.8%) aged 25 to 44, 17,349 people (30.8%) aged 45 to 64, and 9,214 people (16.3%) who were 65 years of age or older. The median age was 43.1 years. For every 100 females, there were 91.2 males. For every 100 females age 18 and over, there were 87.7 males according to the census.

The homeowner vacancy rate was 1.1%; the rental vacancy rate was 6.7%. 37,000 people (65.6% of the population) lived in owner-occupied housing units and 18,502 people (32.8%) lived in rental housing
units.

Economy
Arcadia's economy is driven by wholesale trade, retail trade, manufacturing, health care and social assistance, arts, entertainment, and recreation. Revenue from the Santa Anita Racetrack has long supported capital improvements for the City of Arcadia, resulting in the city having very little bonded indebtedness.

The Westfield Santa Anita mall (formerly the Santa Anita Fashion Park) is a major shopping center in the city.  In 2005, the Westfield Santa Anita completed its first phase of expansion, featuring a new food court, Sport Chalet (now closed), Dave & Busters, numerous smaller retailers, various full-service eateries in an area known as Restaurant Square, and a 16-screen AMC Theatres megaplex. In 2008, expansion of the mall continued as the Promenade outdoor structure was completed, with new high-end retailers such as Coach and Talbots.

In 2004, citing success from regional shopping malls such as The Grove and The Americana, Caruso Affiliated and Magna Entertainment (the owners of the Santa Anita Park racetrack) proposed to build a second large shopping mall adjacent to Westfield Santa Anita on the grounds of the Santa Anita Park south parking lot, which would have made Arcadia the largest retail shopping district in Los Angeles County. The controversial project, known as "The Shops at Santa Anita", originally included signature retail, restaurants, condominium projects, a decorative water display, and a horse-drawn trolley. Arcadia City Council unanimously approved the project in 2007 after much heated debate between some residents in the community and corporate interests, which included ballot initiatives such as free parking for Arcadia residents, prevention of retail signage installations, and downsizing the project by the removal of condominiums from the project. Magna Entertainment filed for Chapter 11 bankruptcy during the Great Recession in 2009 and dissolved the partnership with Caruso Affiliated, with Caruso Affiliated a filing a $21 million bankruptcy claim in 2010 to cover damages Caruso Affiliated incurred as a result of the inability to complete the project. The plan to build "The Shops at Santa Anita" was ultimately terminated on May 20, 2011.

Top employers
According to the city's 2020 Comprehensive Annual Financial Report,  the top private employers in the city are:

Tourism
The Los Angeles County Arboretum and Botanic Garden is located in Arcadia across from the Santa Anita mall and racetrack. The peafowl that roam free on the grounds and in the neighborhoods near the arboretum are a remainder of the former Baldwin ranch. When the peafowl were brought from India, they helped control snakes and snails on his farm. They are considered an attraction to some residents and a nuisance to others due to their loud cries and the droppings they leave on residents' properties.

Government

Local government
Arcadia is a charter city governed by a five-member City Council (which also serves as the city's Redevelopment Agency), with each member serving a four-year term. The Council elects from its membership a Mayor to serve as its presiding officer for a one-year term.

Effective with the 2018 elections, Arcadia voters elect a City Council member by geographical district instead of at-large.

The current city council members are:

Mayor: Paul P. Cheng 
Mayor Pro Tem: April Verlato 
City Council: Michael Cao, Sharon Kwan, and Eileen Wang

List of mayors
This is a list of Arcadia mayors by year.
1927-1930 A. N. Multer 
1952-1954 John A. Schmocker ~ "politicalgraveyard_mayor"/
1969-1970 C. Robert Arth
1973-1974 C. Robert Arth
1974-1975 Alton E. Scott 
1975-1976 Charles E. Gilb 
1976-1977 Floretta K. Lauber - First woman mayor of Arcadia.
1977-1978 Jack Saelid 
1978-1979 David E. Parry 
1979-1980 Robert G. Margett 
1980-1981 Donald D. Pellegrino 
1981-1982 Charles E. Gilb 
1982-1983 Donald D. Pellegrino 
1983-1984 Dennis A. Lojeski 
1984-1985 David S. Hannah 
1985-1986 Donald D. Pellegrino 
1986-1987 Mary B. Young 
1987-1988 Charles E. Gilb 
1988-1989 Robert C. Harbricht 
1989-1990 Roger Chandler 
1990-1991 Mary B. Young 
1991-1992 Charles E. Gilb 
1992-1993 George Faching 
1993-1994 Joseph Ciraulo 
1994-1995 Mary B. Young 
1995-1996 Dennis A. Lojeski 
1996-1997 Barbara D. Kuhn 
1997-1998 Robert C. Harbricht 
1998-1999 Gary A. Kovacic 
1999-2000 Roger Chandler 
2000-2001 Gary A. Kovacic 
2001-2002 Mickey Segal 
2002-2003 Gail A. Marshall 
2003 Sheng Chang 
2003 Gary A. Kovacic 
2003-2004 John Wuo 
2004 Mickey Segal 
2004-2005 Gary A. Kovacic 
2005-2006 John Wuo 
2006-2007 Roger Chandler 
2007-2008 Mickey Segal 
2008-2009 Robert C. Harbricht 
2010 Peter Amundson 
 2011-2012 Gary A. Kovacic 
 2015-2016 Gary A. Kovacic 
2016-2017 Tom Beck
2017-2018 Peter Amudson
2018-2019 Sho Tay
2019-2020 April Verlato 
2020-2021 Rodger Chandler
2021-2022 Sho Tay
2022 Paul P. Cheng

County government
In the Los Angeles County Board of Supervisors, Arcadia is in the Fifth District, represented by Kathryn Barger.

The Los Angeles County Department of Health Services operates the Monrovia Health Center in Monrovia, serving Arcadia.

State and federal representation

Education
For primary and secondary education the city is served by the Arcadia Unified School District. Reading scores for the AUSD are 76.6% higher than the state average and math scores are 67.9% higher than the state average. It is estimated that 88% of Arcadia students are at public schools and 12% in private and/or parochial institutions.

Arcadia Unified School District has one highly ranked and prestigious high school, Arcadia High School. It is among the few public high schools in California to receive a distinguished GreatSchools Rating of 10 out of 10. There are three middle schools, and six elementary schools, two which are winners in the United States Department of Education's Blue Ribbon Schools program. Approximately five percent of California schools are awarded this honor each year following a rigorous selection process. Eligibility is based on federal and state criteria including the No Child Left Behind program, Academic Performance Index (API), and Adequate Yearly Progress (AYP). The requirements are many and strict, and are based on such areas as a strong curriculum, solid library media services, professional teachers, and counseling programs at all grade levels. In 2010, BusinessWeek ranked Arcadia as the best place to raise children in the state of California for the second year in a row, citing the city's excellent school system as one of the factors in addition to the low crime rate.

Elementary schools
Baldwin Stocker Elementary	422 West Lemon Ave.,	grades K–5,	 673 students
Camino Grove Elementary	700 Camino Grove Ave.,	K–5,	 635 students
Highland Oaks Elementary	10 Virginia Dr., K–5,  698 students
Holly Avenue Elementary	360 West Duarte Rd., K–5,	 692 students
Longley Way Elementary	2601 Longley Way, K–5,	 485 students
Reid (Hugo) Elementary	1000 Hugo Reid Dr.,	K–5,	634 students

Middle schools
Dana (Richard Henry) Middle,	1401 South First Ave., grades 6–8, 731 students
First Avenue Middle, 301 South First Ave., grades 6–8, 809 students
Foothills Middle,	171 East Sycamore Ave., grades 6–8, 734 students

High school
Arcadia High School

The Academic Performance Index measures the academic performance and growth of schools on a variety of points. Arcadia High School scored 890, making it the highest-performing large high school in California. In 2010, Arcadia High had 29 National Merit Award finalists. Arcadia is also home to the two-time National Championship boys cross-country team (2010 and 2012).

Infrastructure

Police and fire 
The Arcadia Police Department and Arcadia Fire Department serves the city of Arcadia.

Transportation
Arcadia has several arterial roads that traverse the city. The major east–west streets include Foothill Boulevard, Huntington Drive, Duarte Road, Las Tunas Drive, and Live Oak Avenue. The major north–south streets include Baldwin Avenue and Santa Anita Avenue. It is also served by the Foothill Freeway (I-210).

Arcadia Transit 
The city of Arcadia operates three fixed route services, as well as a Dial-A-Ride that provides curb-to-curb service throughout city limits.

Metro L Line 
In 2016, Metro opened a new at-grade light rail station in Arcadia. Arcadia Station is located northwest of the intersection of 1st Avenue and Santa Clara Street, and is served by the Metro L Line.

Healthcare
The 460-bed hospital opened in Arcadia in 1957, after moving from downtown Los Angeles. USC Arcadia Hospital was the state's first community hospital to have a psychiatric unit. Its nursery school was one of the first corporate daycare facilities in the U.S. It was an Official Hospital of the 1984 Olympic Games.

To keep up with the changing needs of the community, several upgrades have been made to the original facility. In 1998, the Berger Tower was completed, adding 169 beds. USC Arcadia Hospital underwent a major renovation and expansion in 2006, and in the fall of 2011, a new five-story patient tower and new emergency department were opened.

The Methodist Hospital School of Nursing
A School of Nursing opened at the hospital in 1915, with a class of 30 students. Ten years later, a residence was built to accommodate 150 graduate and student nurses. This four-story brick building, known as Philomena Hall, was connected to the hospital by an underground corridor and provided accommodations, classrooms and a gymnasium for the nurses. Beginning in 1944 (after a nine-year school closure), additional housing for nurses was provided in a refurbished residential house adjacent to Philomena Hall. After more than 40 years of operation and the graduation of hundreds of talented young nurses, the School of Nursing closed. Times had changed, and the practice of nursing education had moved into the domain of the formal education system. The school was phased out in 1958 with the graduation of the last nursing class.

Water & Sewer 
The City of Arcadia provides services for water and sewer to its residents. The city operates its own water distribution system via the Public Works Services Department. Arcadia's water supply comes from groundwater from municipal owned water pumps from the Main San Gabriel Basin and the Raymond Basin, both which are replenished with local rainwater and imported water.

In popular culture
 
U.S. Route 66, immortalized in song and literature, passes through Arcadia, on Huntington Drive in Downtown Arcadia, before turning off onto Colorado Place and then Colorado Street. After intersecting the 210 freeway, Route 66 runs parallel to and south of the freeway, cutting across the middle section of Arcadia.

The city is mentioned by Jack Kerouac in his novel On the Road: Sal, the protagonist, is put off by "preppy" teens when he stops for food at a local drive-in restaurant with a young Mexican woman. The vignette demonstrates the culture clash between the "Beatnik" way of life and that of 1950s conservative America.

In a motel located in Arcadia across the street northeast from Santa Anita Racetrack, author Hunter S. Thompson wrote much of his novel Fear and Loathing in Las Vegas in the 1970s. In Michael Cunningham's novel The Hours, Laura Brown mentions that she heard of a man who died in nearby Arcadia.

The McDonald brothers, who later began the McDonald's hamburger restaurant chain, opened their first restaurant, The Airdrome, near Monrovia Airport, on the Arcadia–Monrovia border in 1937. The restaurant was located on historic Route 66, now Huntington Drive, but later moved to San Bernardino, California, in 1940.

The main setting of the DreamWorks' franchise Tales of Arcadia took place in Arcadia Oaks, a fictionalized version of Arcadia, California.

Filming locations

Many films on location (including Tarzan and the Bing Crosby On the Road movies), television series, most notably Fantasy Island were filmed in Arcadia. A popular visiting site is the house with the bell tower, where Tattoo rang the bell, is the Queen Anne Cottage, located in the Los Angeles County Arboretum and Botanic Garden in Arcadia. The plane, "arriving" with the guests, was filmed in the lagoon behind the Queen Anne Cottage. Occasionally, outdoor scenes and commercials are filmed at the Arboretum have been filmed on the grounds of the Los Angeles County Arboretum and Botanic Garden.

The Santa Anita Park Racetrack is another popular filming locations. The true story film Seabiscuit (2003) was filmed and takes place at the Santa Anita race track. A commercial for Claritin allergy medicine, a Lexus commercial, and three episodes of Grey's Anatomy have used it as a location ("Walk on Water", "Drowning on Dry Land" and "Some Kind of Miracle").

This city was one of the filming locations for Columbia Pictures' comedy film North (1994).

The fantasy-comedy film Matilda was shot here in 1996.

A scene from Step Brothers (2008) was shot at the nearby Derby restaurant.

Scenes from Mission: Impossible III (2006) were shot at Methodist Hospital.

In the movie Cloverfield, the scene in which the survivors walk inside Bloomingdale's was actually filmed inside a Robinsons-May store under reconstruction inside the Westfield Santa Anita in Arcadia. The film Eagle Eye (2008) was also filmed in this location.

Scenes from Kicking & Screaming (2005) were shot at Foothill Middle School and in Arcadia homes.

The movie The Lone Ranger (2013) filmed their train scenes here within the Santa Anita Race Track parking lot by building an elevated 'roller coaster' like track.

The comedy film Deal of a Lifetime (1999) was filmed entirely at Arcadia High School.

The movie Moxie (2021) was filmed at Arcadia High School's North Gym and Salter Stadium.

Notable people

Michael Anthony, bassist of the band Van Halen, graduated from Arcadia High School in 1972
Marty Barrett, baseball player
Ryan Bergara, cohost on Buzzfeed Unsolved and cofounder of Watcher Entertainment
Tracy Caldwell Dyson, astronaut. Born in Arcadia.
Jason Chen, singer
Jimmy Conrad, former soccer defender. Born in Arcadia.
Sven Davidson, tennis player who won the French Open and Wimbledon
John Grabow, major league baseball pitcher
Jeff Grosso, professional skateboarder
Phil Hendrie, radio personality, grew up in Arcadia and graduated from Arcadia High School in 1970
Colleen Kay Hutchins, Miss America 1952, was raised in Arcadia
Maren Jensen, actress, was born in Arcadia
Brittany Klein, soccer player
Rudy Kurniawan, wine swindler
Jimmy Lambert, baseball Player
Ted Leonard of band Enchant was born in Arcadia
Jet Li, international film star and martial artist, resided in Arcadia with his wife, a former Miss China
Johnny Lindell, Major League Baseball player
Bruce McNall, owned NHL's Los Angeles Kings, was born in Arcadia
Mirai Nagasu, Olympic figure skater, 6-time medalist in U.S. championships
Lindsay Price, actress and wife of Curtis Stone
Jason Robertson, professional hockey player
Nick Robertson, professional hockey player
John Speraw, Head Coach US Men's Olympic Volleyball Team
Mark Tuan, member of South Korean boy-band GOT7
Rena Wang, badminton player
Steve Westly, politician and venture capitalist
Wil Wheaton, actor, Star Trek: The Next Generation
George Woolf, horse jockey, owner of The Derby restaurant in Arcadia and rider of Seabiscuit
Tim Worrell, professional baseball pitcher
Todd Worrell, professional baseball relief pitcher
Erica Wu, table tennis Olympian
Genie, a feral child

Sister cities
Arcadia has one sister city (Newcastle, Australia), as designated by Sister Cities International.  Consequently, Newcastle Park can be found on Colorado Boulevard.  There is also an Arcadia Park in Newcastle.

See also

Arcadia Invitational
Hugo Reid Adobe, 1839 California Historic Landmark
Chinese enclaves in the San Gabriel Valley

References

Further reading

"The California Town Where Chinese Millionaires House their Kids—and Mistresses ." Vocativ. December 5, 2014.

External links

Arcadia Historical Society

 
1903 establishments in California
Populated places established in 1903
Cities in Los Angeles County, California
Communities in the San Gabriel Valley
Incorporated cities and towns in California
Chinese-American culture in California